The 2011 Yobe State gubernatorial election was the 5th gubernatorial election of Yobe State. Held on April 26, 2011, the All Nigeria Peoples Party nominee Ibrahim Gaidam won the election, defeating Usman Albishir of the People's Democratic Party.

Results 
A total of 6 candidates contested in the election. Ibrahim Gaidam from the All Nigeria Peoples Party won the election, defeating Usman Albishir from the People's Democratic Party. Valid votes was 656,128.

References 

Yobe State gubernatorial elections
Yobe gubernatorial
April 2011 events in Nigeria